Lee Kam Wah (born 14 May 1940) is a Hong Kong boxer. He competed in the men's flyweight event at the 1964 Summer Olympics.

References

External links
 

1940 births
Living people
Hong Kong male boxers
Olympic boxers of Hong Kong
Boxers at the 1964 Summer Olympics
Place of birth missing (living people)
Flyweight boxers